Richmond Town Hall may refer to the following town halls:

 Old Town Hall, Richmond, London, England
 Richmond Town Hall, Melbourne, Victoria, Australia
 Richmond Town Hall (New Hampshire), United States
 Richmond Town Hall, North Yorkshire, England